Joseph White (dates unknown) was an English first-class cricketer who played for Surrey in the 1800s and is recorded in one match in 1806, scoring 3 runs with a highest score of 2.

References

Bibliography
 

English cricketers
English cricketers of 1787 to 1825
Surrey cricketers
Year of birth unknown
Year of death unknown